Peter Burke (born 26 April 1957) is a former English  footballer who played as a defender.

References

1957 births
Living people
English footballers
Association football defenders
Rochdale A.F.C. players
Halifax Town A.F.C. players
Barnsley F.C. players
English Football League players